Zargarmahalleh (also Romanized as Zargarmaḩalleh and Zargar Maḩalleh) is a city and capital of Lalehabad District, Babol County, Mazandaran Province, Iran.  At the 2006 census, its population was 425, in 110 families.

References

Populated places in Babol County

Cities in Mazandaran Province